Mohammad Fahad Rahman (born 2003) is a Bangladeshi chess player.

Career
Rahman qualified for the Chess World Cup 2019, where he was defeated by second seed Anish Giri in the first round.

Rahman was due to be coached by Igor Rausis during the World Cup, but Rausis was caught cheating in the Strasbourg Open, and the Bangladesh Chess Federation cut ties with Rausis.

References

External links
 
 
 

2003 births
Living people
Bangladeshi chess players
Chess International Masters